The Main Street Bridge, historically known as the Califon Bridge, is a Pratt thru truss bridge that carries Main Street (County Route 512) over the South Branch Raritan River in Califon, Hunterdon County, New Jersey. The bridge was added to the National Register of Historic Places on October 14, 1976 as part of the Califon Historic District.

History
The iron truss bridge was constructed in 1887 by I. P. Bartley & Co. of Mount Olive Township in Morris County. In 1985, the bridge was rehabilitated and widened by converting to a stringer bridge design using steel beams, while maintaining the historic original trusses.

Gallery

See also
 List of bridges documented by the Historic American Engineering Record in New Jersey
 List of bridges on the National Register of Historic Places in New Jersey
 List of crossings of the Raritan River

References

External links
 
 
 

Califon, New Jersey
Bridges over the Raritan River
Historic American Engineering Record in New Jersey
Historic district contributing properties in New Jersey
Historic district contributing properties in Hunterdon County, New Jersey
National Register of Historic Places in Hunterdon County, New Jersey
Road bridges on the National Register of Historic Places in New Jersey
Pratt truss bridges in the United States
Beam bridges in the United States
Bridges in Hunterdon County, New Jersey
Bridges completed in 1887